Warrant Officer Class 1 Paul Christopher Carney (born November 1979) is a senior British Army soldier. Since 2021, he has served as the Army Sergeant Major, the most senior warrant officer and member of the other ranks in the British Army.

Military career
Carney served as a warrant officer with the Royal Engineers and was commissioned as a captain on 2 April 2018. After service as Field Army Sergeant Major, he was promoted to major on 31 July 2021 and appointed Army Sergeant Major in August 2021, thereby becoming the most senior member of the other ranks of the British Army.

References

 

 
 

1979 births
Army Sergeant Majors
British Army personnel of the Iraq War
British Army personnel of the War in Afghanistan (2001–2021)
Living people
Royal Engineers officers
Royal Engineers soldiers